Abu Ghosh Vocal Music Festival is a vocal music festival that takes place biannually during the Jewish holidays of Sukkot and Shavuot, at Our Lady of the Ark of the Covenant Church in Abu Ghosh, Israel.

History
The music festival was inaugurated in 1957 by pharmacology professor, Felix Zolmann, and pianist and conductor Zigi Shtaderman, following the discovery of the excellent acoustics of the hilltop church in Abu Ghosh. Musicians and choir singers came from all over Israel and foreign countries, and the church hosted the festival free of charge. Since 1992, the festival  has been organized by the Association for the Promotion of Music and Culture in Abu Ghosh and the Judean Mountains.

References

External links
Abu Ghosh Vocal Music Festival website

Music festivals in Israel
1957 establishments in Israel
Abu Ghosh